Belgorodsky District is an administrative district (raion), one of the twenty-one in Belgorod Oblast, Russia. Municipally, it is incorporated as Belgorodsky Municipal District. It is located in the southwest of the oblast, on the border with Ukraine. Its administrative center is the rural locality (a settlement) of Maysky. Population:   90,430 (2002 Census);  The population of Maysky accounts for 7.4% of the district's total population.

Geography
Belgorodsky District is in the southwestern part of Belgorod Oblast and surrounds the city of Belgorod. The district is bordered on the west by Borisovsky District, on the north by Yakovlevsky District and Korochansky District, on the east by Shebekinsky District, and on the south by Kharkiv Oblast of Ukraine. The administrative center of the district is the town of Maysky, which is 16 kilometers south-west of central Belgorod.

The major river through the district is the Donets, which flows south to through eastern Ukraine to the Don river. Belogorye Nature Reserve, one of Russia's oldest "zapovedniks" (strict nature reserves), is located in Belgorodsky District.

References

Sources

External links
 Belogorodsky District on Google Maps
 Belgorodsky District on OpenStreetMap

Districts of Belgorod Oblast